State Road 601 (NM 601) is a  state highway in the US state of New Mexico. NM 601's southern terminus is at U.S. Route 60 (US 60) west of Quemado, and the northern terminus is a continuation as Cibola County Route 35A (CR 35A) at the Catron–Cibola county line. CR 35A continues north to NM 36.

History
The portion from the Cibola County line north to NM 36 maintenance was transferred to Cibola County on July 11, 1989 in a road exchange agreement.

Major intersections

See also

References

601
Transportation in Catron County, New Mexico